Outrigger Peak is a  mountain summit in British Columbia, Canada.

Description

Outrigger Peak is a double summit located in the Battle Range of the Selkirk Mountains. Typee Mountain is one kilometer west of Outrigger and Omoo Peak is one kilometer northeast. Precipitation runoff from the mountain drains north into the headwaters of Butters Creek and south into Houston Creek which are both tributaries of the Duncan River. Outrigger Peak is more notable for its steep rise above local terrain than for its absolute elevation. The first ascent of Outrigger's summit was made in 1972 by Andrew J. Kauffman II, Judge David Michael, Arnold Wexler and John Markel.

Etymology

The landform's name follows the Herman Melville-associated naming theme of this area established in 1958–59 by the Sam Silverstein-Douglas Anger climbing party. Melville's novels Omoo and Typee are centered around the islands of Polynesia. An outrigger is a boat commonly used in this part of the world. The mountain's toponym was officially adopted on October 3, 1973, by the Geographical Names Board of Canada.

Climate

Based on the Köppen climate classification, Outrigger Peak is located in a subarctic climate zone with cold, snowy winters, and mild summers. Winter temperatures can drop below −20 °C with wind chill factors below −30 °C. This climate supports the Pequod Glacier on the northwest slope of the peak.

See also
Geography of British Columbia

References

External links
 Outrigger Peak: Weather forecast

Two-thousanders of British Columbia
Selkirk Mountains
Kootenay Land District